Armadahan is a traditional two-masted double-outrigger fishing boat from Laguna de Bay in the Philippines. They are rigged with two square spritsails.

See also
Balacion
Casco (barge)
Guilalo
Salambaw

References

Indigenous ships of the Philippines